Henshilwood is a surname. Notable people with the surname include:

Cheryl Henshilwood (born 1952), New Zealand cricketer
Christopher Henshilwood, South African archaeologist
Elizabeth Henshilwood (born 1975), British rower
Linda Henshilwood, later known as Linda Rose Lindsay (born 1950), New Zealand cricketer